The  is a Japanese clan. The Sanada were long associated with Matsushiro Domain in modern-day Nagano (city), Nagano Prefecture.

History
The Sanada clan claimed descent from the Seiwa Genji. Historically, the clan's banner was established by Unno Yukiyoshi in the early 16th century. He emblazoned the Rokumonsen on his banner. The Sanada were key vassals in the Takeda army, with three famous generals being Sanada Yukitaka and his sons Sanada Nobutsuna, Sanada Masateru, and Sanada Masayuki.

Sanada Yukitaka, son of Unno Munetsuna, established the clan and its name at the beginning of the 16th century.

In the Sengoku period, Sanada Masayuki (1547–1611) led the clan. His second son Sanada Yukimura (1567–1615) was sent as a hostage to the Toyotomi clan in 1587. In 1594, he married Chikurin-in, an adopted daughter of Toyotomi Hideyoshi; therefore, he was officially Hideyoshi's son-in-law.

In 1600, at the Battle of Sekigahara, Yukimura sided with the Western army. He fought against Tokugawa Hidetada at Ueda Castle, successfully delaying him from reaching Sekigahara with 38,000 reinforcements. He opposed the Tokugawa again at the Battle of Osaka where he died.

Edo era
Sanada Nobuyuki (1566–1658) was the oldest son of Masayuki. In 1587 he married Komatsuhime, an adopted daughter of Tokugawa Ieyasu. Therefore he was officially Ieyasu's son-in-law. In 1600, he sided with the Eastern army.  He was given control of Ueda Domain in Shinano Province and Numata Domain in Kōzuke Province with revenues of 65,000 koku. In 1622, Nobuyuki was transferred to Matsushiro Domain (100,000 koku) in Shinano. His descendants remained there until the Meiji Restoration in 1868.

Sanada clan forces took part in the attack on Aizu in 1868, on the side of the imperial army, but refused to take charge of Aizu prisoners of war.

Modern era
In 1871, the former daimyō was made a count in the kazoku peerage system. The head of a cadet branch of the clan was given the title of baron.

The Meiji-era ornithologist Yukiyasu Kiyosu was the son of Sanada Yukitami, the last lord of Matsushiro.

Family heads

 Sanada Yukiyoshi (Unno)
 Sanada Yukitaka (幸隆)
 Sanada Nobutsuna
 Sanada Masayuki
 Sanada Nobuyuki
 Sanada Nobumasa
 Sanada Yukimichi
 Sanada Nobuhiro
 Sanada Nobuyasu
 Sanada Yukihiro
 Sanada Yukitaka (幸専)
 Sanada Yukitsura
 Sanada Yukinori
 Sanada Yukimoto

Notable members
 Sanada Yukitaka (真田 幸隆, 1512–1574)
 Sanada Nobutsuna (真田 信綱, 1537–1575)
 Sanada Masateru (真田 昌輝, d. 1575) 
 Sanada Masayuki (真田 昌幸, 1547–1611)
 Sanada Nobuyuki (真田 信之, 1566–1658)
 Komatsuhime (小松姫, 1573–1620)
 Sanada Yukimura (真田 幸村, 1567–1615) also known as Sanada Nobushige (真田 信繁)
 Chikurin-in (竹林院, 1579–1649)
 Sanada Nobuyoshi (真田 信吉, 1593–1634)
 Sanada Nobumasa (真田 信政, 1597–1658)
 Sanada Yukimasa (真田 幸昌, 1600–1615) also known as Sanada Daisuke (真田 大助)
 Sanada Morinobu (真田 守信, 1612–1671) also known as Sanada Daihachi (真田 大八)

Notable retainers

Sakuma Shōzan 佐久間象山 (1811–1864)
 Hayashi Sanada (sometimes spelled Hayashi Sanda) 真田林 (1803–1842)

Television

NHK Television in Japan will be airing an annual Taiga broadcast about the Sengoku Jidai. This time (2016) it is the Sanada Maru.

References

External links
 真田氏 at Harimaya.com 
 真田氏 at Rokumonsen.com  
 Yukiyoshi history of Unno/Sanada

 
Japanese clans